Tolga Mendi (born 23 March 1993; Adana, Turkey) is a Turkish actor.

Life and career 
Tolga Mendi is born on 23 March 1993 in Adana, Turkey. because he was born into a religious family to enter the field of acting he faced strong opposition from his family  After he graduated from İsmail Safa Özler Anatolian High School, he started to study construction engineering at Çukurova University.

Tolga Mendi studied acting 2 terms and started his career with Turkish TV series Acı Aşk (Love, Bitter) and Rüzgarın Kalbi. Mendi became famous in Yeni Gelin (New Bride) and played a lead role as Hazar Bozok with co-star Jessica May in 2017. Currently, Tolga Mendi is playing a lead role in his new Turkish TV series Sol Yanım (My Left Side) as Selim Kutlusay.

Filmography

TV series

References

External links 

 
 Tolga Mendi on Instagram

Living people
1993 births
21st-century Turkish male actors
Turkish male television actors